New Savannah Bluff Lock and Dam is a dam with inactive lock at the site of the dead town of New Savannah, Georgia on the Savannah River south of Augusta, Georgia.

Purpose
It does not serve a hydroelectric power generation or flood control function.

History
Located at river mile 187.4, the lock and dam was authorized by the 1930 and 1935 Rivers and Harbors Acts to facilitate commercial navigation on the upper reaches of the Savannah River. The structure was completed in 1937. The last commercial shipping to use the lock ceased in 1979 and the structure and upstream channel fell into disuse. In 1999 the Corps of Engineers proposed demolishing and removing the dam, but local outcry over the resulting impact to users of the impounded pool resulted in the United States Congress declaring in 2000 that the dam would be repaired and then turned over to a local government to be maintained, however the work never received funding.

The Water Infrastructure Improvements for the Nation Act (the WIIN Act), deauthorized the lock and dam and directed the Army Corps to construct fish passage across the existing dam while maintaining the impoundment of water. The deepening of the Savannah River to allow Neopanamax-sized ships reach the Port of Savannah caused saltwater to damage spawning grounds of the endangered shortnose sturgeon near the mouth of the river. Allowing fish passage upriver of the New Savannah Bluff dam to historic spawning grounds was identified as a mitigation to this damage. , the Army Corps presented five alternatives to allow fish passage and expects to select a plan in 2019 and begin construction in 2021.

Current uses
The dam serves water supply users including one municipality, five industries, and one
sod farm; water-related recreation opportunities such as general boating and fishing and
specialized rowing and powerboat race events; and regional economic development and tourism. It is also operated to pass some migratory anadromous fish species. The upstream pool extends through downtown Augusta to near the I-20 bridges.

Structure
This project consists of a lock chamber, dam, operation building, and a  park and recreation area. All are remotely controlled from the J. Strom Thurmond project. The lock is on the Georgia side of the river adjacent to the dam. Construction of this concrete gravity structure supported by timber piles was completed in 1937.

Gallery

Notes
This article contains public domain text from the Corps of Engineers.

References

External links
Construction General; New Savannah Bluff Lock and Dam; US Army Corps of Engineers
New Savannah Bluff Lock & Dam Park; City of Augusta

Dams in Georgia (U.S. state)
Transport infrastructure completed in 1937
Buildings and structures in Richmond County, Georgia
Buildings and structures in Aiken County, South Carolina
United States Army Corps of Engineers dams
Dams completed in 1937
Dams on the Savannah River
1937 establishments in Georgia (U.S. state)
1937 establishments in South Carolina